The DeKalb County School District (DCSD) is a school district headquartered at 1701 Mountain Industrial Boulevard in unincorporated DeKalb County, Georgia, United States, near Stone Mountain and in the Atlanta metropolitan area. DCSD operates public schools in areas of DeKalb County that are not within the city limits of Atlanta and Decatur. It will serve a portion of Atlanta annexed by that city in 2018 until 2024, when that portion will be re-assigned to Atlanta Public Schools (APS).

The school district is overseen by the seven-member DeKalb County Board of Education. The interim superintendent/CEO is, as of May 18, 2022, Dr. Vasanne S. Tinsley. The system educates more than 102,000 students at 138 schools with more than 14,000 full-time employees and 6,000 teachers. In 2018, the school system graduated over 5,800 students from high school.

The district includes three of the top-ranked schools in the nation in 2018 according to U.S. News & World Report. The DeKalb School of the Arts earned a gold designation after being ranked No. 75 overall, and No. 2 in Georgia. Chamblee Charter High School also earned a gold designation, ranking No. 457 nationwide and No. 14 in Georgia. The Arabia Mountain High School Academy of Engineering-Medicine performed well enough to earn a silver designation, ranking No. 58 in Georgia. DeKalb Early College Academy earned a bronze designation, ranking No. 68 in Georgia.

DCSD is also home to Henderson Mill Elementary School, the first STEAM (Science, Technology, Engineering, Arts and Math) certified school in Georgia.

History

Accreditation 
In 2017, the DeKalb County School District received a full, five-year renewal of its accreditation from AdvancED, through 2022. The renewal comes after the district regained full accreditation in 2016.

On December 17, 2012, the Southern Association of Colleges and Schools announced that it had downgraded the DeKalb County School District's status from "on advisement" to "on probation" and warned the school system that the loss of their accreditation was "imminent."

On January 21, 2014, the Southern Association of Colleges and Schools announced that it had upgraded the DeKalb County School District's status from "probation" to "accredited warned" which is below full accreditation status.

Academic Achievement 
In 2017, the DCSD College and Career Ready Performance Index (CCRPI) score increased to 70, up from 66 in 2016. Since 2016, the CCRPI score for elementary schools increased five points; middle schools increased three points; and high schools increased nearly one full point.

In 2017, more than 2,500 students in DCSD took the ACT, earning a composite score of 19.8, compared to last year's composite score of 19.4. That same year, more than 3,500 students took the SAT; the district's total composite score continues to improve year-over-year. DeKalb's 2017 total mean score for the SAT was 980.

The four-year graduation rate for DCSD's Class of 2017 was 74 percent, a four-point increase from the 2016 graduation rate of 70 percent. Between 2013 and 2017, the District graduation rate improved 14 percentage points.

Indictment

Former DeKalb County Schools Superintendent Crawford Lewis was indicted in 2012, along with former DeKalb County Schools Chief Operating Officer Pat Pope (Reed), and others, on criminal charges related to a school construction scandal. The indictment listed four counts of racketeering, as well as theft by taking and bribery.

Shooting and hostage situation 
On August 20, 2013, a man with an AK-47 entered the front office of Ronald E. McNair Discovery Learning Academy, an elementary school, and barricaded himself. He fired six shots at police officers outside, who returned fire. The school's students were evacuated. Antoinette Tuff, a school bookkeeper, was able to convince him to surrender without further violence; she was later praised by President Barack Obama for her courage and calmness in defusing the situation.

Bus drivers' strike 

From April 19–23, 2018 nearly 400 school bus drivers for the district participated in a strike over low pay and little employee benefits. Inspired in part by the concurrent nationwide teacher strikes in states such as West Virginia, Oklahoma and Arizona, bus drivers for the district planned a "sick-out". About 42 percent of bus drivers in the county participated, causing nearly 60-90 minute delays in students being picked up for school. As a right-to-work state, public sector employees are prohibited in Georgia from striking. The strike resulted in at least 7 bus drivers, particularly ones who helped organize the strike, being terminated of employment.

Emory and CDC annexation by Atlanta 

The City of Atlanta, in 2017, agreed to annex territory in DeKalb County, including the Centers for Disease Control and Emory University, effective January 1, 2018. In 2016 Emory University made a statement that "Annexation of Emory into the City of Atlanta will not change school districts, since neighboring communities like Druid Hills will still be self-determining regarding annexation." By 2017 the city agreed to include the annexed area in the boundaries of Atlanta Public Schools (APS), a move decried by the leadership of the DeKalb county district as it would take taxable property away from that district. In 2017 the number of children living in the annexed territory who attended public schools was nine. The area ultimately went to APS, and as part of a 2019 settlement Emory would help establish school-based clinics for DeKalb schools. Students will be rezoned to APS effective 2024; they will be zoned to DeKalb schools before then.

Schools and centers

Elementary schools
Zoned

Optional
 DeKalb Elementary School of the Arts (2002)
 Oakcliff Traditional Theme School (unincorporated)
 Oakcliff Traditional Theme School (as of 1993, formerly Oakcliff Elementary) (1964)

Middle schools
Zoned

High schools
Zoned

Optional
 Arabia Mountain High School
 DeKalb School of the Arts (unincorporated)
 Elizabeth Andrews High School (unincorporated)

Centers
Alternative

Partnerships
 Children's Healthcare of Atlanta

Former schools

Elementary schools 
 Atherton Elementary (1964-2011) 
 Brookhaven Elementary School 1948-1975 (DeKalb Public Library, North Druid Hills branch annex 1976-1985, Brookhaven Boys' and Girls' Club 1985-2017.property sold for residential development demolished 2018)
 Jim Cherry Elementary School 1949-1975 (North Dekalb Mental Health Center, 1976-1988, Seigakuin International Japanese School 1990-2003, PATH Academy charter school 2005-current)
 Forrest Hills Elementary School, 1954-2004 (The Museum School of Avondale Estates Charter School 2012-current)
 Glen Haven Elementary (1943-2011) Current home of DeKalb Preparatory Academy Charter School
 Gresham Park Elementary (1958-2011) Demolished in 2014
 Margaret Harris Elementary School, 1967-1988 (currently Margaret Harris Comprehensive School)
 Heritage Elementary School, 1968-1999 (Heritage School 2000-2010, Globe Academy Charter 2013-current)
 Hooper Alexander Elementary School, 1935-2008 (building destroyed by fire January 2014) Remainder of Building demolished in 2014
 Kittredge Elementary School 1958-1975 (4th-7th grades only 1969-1974, special needs students K-7 1970-1975) (open campus West High school 1975-1988, Kittredge Magnet School 1989-2008, International Student Center 2008-2012) Currently houses John R. Lewis ES until new building is constructed on current site of Skyland Park, which was acquired through land deal with City of Brookhaven.
 Medlock Elementary School, 1951-2011 (The International Community Charter School private academy, ten-year lease for the building 2012-current)
 Midway Elementary (1958-2015) Currently houses International Community Charter School
 Nancy Creek Elementary School, 1970-2008 (Kittredge Magnet School 2008-current)
 Northwoods Elementary School 1954-1984 (Yeshivah Hebrew Orthodox High School 1986-2016 Currently home of Tapestry Charter School)
 Oakcliff Elementary, 1964-1993 (Oakcliff Traditional Theme School, 1993-current)
 Rehoboth Elementary School, 1963-1979 (Dekalb Schools employee training and records center 1980-1998, The William Bradley Bryant Center, 1999-current)
 Shallowford Elementary School, 1968-1997 (Chamblee Middle School 1997-2006, demolished in July 2014)
 Robert Shaw Elementary School, 1955-1969 (Robert Shaw student Diagnostic Testing and Instructional center 1970-1997, Robert Shaw Theme School 1998-current)
 Sky Haven Elementary (1955-2011) (property held/maintained for school system's possible future reuse (2011-2016), site demolished summer 2016)
 Skyland Elementary School 1948-1989 (Georgia Dept. of Human Resources, Center for Vital Records 1991-2017) Bought by City of Brookhaven 2017 for Skyland park.future home of John R.Lewis Elementary School(opening 2022)in Land swap deal with City of Brookhaven after study of dramatic population increase in the area indicated need of a new School.
 Leslie J. Steele Elementary School, 1951-2006 (demolished and site reconstructed as Ronald E. McNair Discovery Learning Academy 2008)
 W.D. Thomson Elementary School, 1939-1975 (demolished 1976)
 Tilson Elementary (1958-2008) Demolished in 2014
 Tucker Elementary School, 1955-1983 (Tucker Recreation Center, 1985-current)
 Wesley Chapel Elementary School, 1953-1979 (currently Dekalb Transition Academy, since 1990) Demolished in 2016

Middle schools 
 Avondale Middle School (unincorporated, adjacent to the city of Avondale Estates), 2000-2011 (housed Fernbank Elementary School, 2013–2015) Currently undergoing renovations to become Performing Arts School

High schools 
 Avondale High School (unincorporated, adjacent to the city of Avondale Estates) 1955-2011 Part of building has been converted to records storage. Other portion houses DeKalb School of the Arts.
 Briarcliff High School, 1962-1987 ( 1988-2008 Dekalb School of the Arts and Open Campus High School, demolished summer 2018)
 Bruce Street High School, 1938-1968
 John B. Gordon High School, 1959-1986 (Became Ronald E. McNair Middle School)
 Hamilton High School (Scottdale, Georgia), 1924-1969 a school for African Americans, currently Hamilton Recreation Center
 Henderson High School 1970-1996 (currently Henderson Middle School)
 Peachtree High School, 1968-1988 (Peachtree Jr High School 1988-2002; demolished, site reconstructed as Peachtree Charter Middle School 2008)
 Sequoyah High School (DeKalb County, Georgia) 1965-1988,(currently Sequoyah Middle School)
 Shamrock High School, 1967-1996 (Shamrock Middle School 1996-2011, name changed to Druid Hills Middle School 2011-current)
 Walker High School, 1966-1987 (Renamed Ronald E. McNair High School)
Centers:
 DeKalb Transition Academy (formerly Wesley Chapel Elementary School) Building was demolished in 2016
 Destiny Academy of Excellence, 2007-2018(unincorporated)

District facilities
 Administrative and Instructional Complex (unincorporated area near Stone Mountain) — The building complex was originally built as an American Fare. After this closed, DeKalb County School District bought the property. The district renovated the original building, converting commercial spaces into educational and office spaces. The building served for a short time as the district's alternative high school before becoming the Administrative and Instructional Complex.
 The William Bradley Bryant Center (unincorporated area near Decatur)
 East DeKalb Campus (unincorporated area near Stone Mountain)
 Sam Moss Service Center(1975) District Logistics Distribution and Storage. District Facilities and Grounds Maintenance. District Transportation Pool and Servicing facilities. (unincorporated area near Tucker)

Athletics
The district offers 17 athletic programs and earned 253 state championships dating back to 1938; the majority of the titles came from track and field and wrestling. The county provides five athletic stadiums:

See also

Fernbank Science Center

References

External links 
 DeKalb County School District
 

School districts in Georgia (U.S. state)
School
DeKalb County School District
School districts established in 1873
1873 establishments in Georgia (U.S. state)